Mohamed Soubei (15 May 1954 – 8 October 2013) was an Egyptian judoka. He competed in the men's half-lightweight event at the 1984 Summer Olympics.

References

External links
 

1954 births
2013 deaths
Egyptian male judoka
Olympic judoka of Egypt
Judoka at the 1984 Summer Olympics
Place of birth missing
20th-century Egyptian people
21st-century Egyptian people